Bath Township is located in Mason County, Illinois. As of the 2010 census, its population was 866 and it contained 475 housing units.

Geography

Demographics

References

External links
City-data.com
Illinois State Archives

Townships in Mason County, Illinois
Townships in Illinois
1861 establishments in Illinois